The Brixton Immortals Domino Club formed in the 1970s, as a team and wider community social club playing Dominoes in Brixton, London, United Kingdom.

With Brixton Blog calling it "Brixton's most successful sport team" it is synonymous with the Brixton Domino Club building, now called the Lloyd Leon Community Centre (LLCC).

History 
It was founded in the 1970s Lloyd Leon MBE (who went on to become Lambeth's first Black mayor) with George Palmer and others from the Caribbean elder community.

Its first base was on Acre Lane, later The Atlantic pub on Coldharbour Lane (where Leon was the then pub landlord) before settling at the building at 297-299 Coldharbour Lane now known as the Lloyd Leon Community Centre.

It is noted for being frequented by the community's Windrush Generation and the wider Caribbean community. Although first and foremost a team, the club acts as a social space and has long been an informal support network and a self help institution. Local MP Helen Hayes commended the club remarking upon the Dominoes game being "“an important and fundamental part of the heritage of this area”.

Dominoes is widely played in Jamaica and the wider Caribbean, so sits strongly in the identity of the London Caribbean diaspora.

The 1990s saw the team play in the United Kingdom Domino League. Lord Scarman and Lambeth's mayor were among attendees at the 1990s finals held at Lambeth Town Hall.

The club now takes part in the Anglo Caribbean Dominoes League (ACDL), winning in 2018. In 2019 the immortals invited a USA team to the club to play against a UK team made up of players from local clubs.

The current head of the club is Mervin Stewart and is sponsored by the Victoria Credit Union in Jamaica.

Club activity and social events 

The club has held dominoes meetings and tournaments at Lambeth Town Hall since the 1980s as well as Windrush Square in central Brixton.
The club regularly holds tournaments as part of Lambeth's Windrush Day celebrations. Also the borough's Black History Month celebrations and Jamaica Independence Day.

Events have been attended and supported by local politicians Bell Ribero-Addy, Helen Hayes and Sonia Winifred.

In recent years the Ubele organisation has supported the Domino Club in building capacity and supporting its management, as well as future planning and refurbishment for the Lloyd Leon Community Centre.

Other Domino clubs in the London Borough of Lambeth include UK Diamonds ladies, Clapham Eagles, Clapham Dominoes Club, Myatt Field Park, Bradford, Crawford Foundation, Knight's Hill, The Golden Anchor and the Cosmopolitan Sports and Social Club, among others. The UK Diamonds ladies have a crossover membership with the Immortals, share the same headquarters at the LLCC and encourage women of all ages to get involved in what has traditionally been seen as a game more popular with men and elders in the community, rather than young women.

The club do frequent outreach events at festivals and teaching Dominoes to young people at local schools.

Headquarters at the Lloyd Leon Community Centre 
The club has operated out of the  Lloyd Leon Community Centre (LLCC), a Grade II listed building at 297-299 Coldharbour Lane. The building houses the domino clubs, Brixton Soup Kitchen and Lawyers In The Soup Kitchen.

The building, converted from two 19th Century terrace houses was opened as the Brixton Sports & Social Club, given to the local Black community following recommendations of the Scarman report after the 1981 Brixton Uprising. It was subsequently known as the Domino Club, being renamed the Lloyd Leon Community Centre after the Club's founder in recent years.

As of 2022, the building is currently closed for repairs and refurbishment.

References

External links 

 Brixton Immortals website
 Brixton Immortals on Twitter

Brixton
Sport in the London Borough of Lambeth
London Borough of Lambeth
Dominoes